David Russell (born 1953 in Glasgow) is a classical guitarist. He is considered a virtuoso with a captivating stage presence, impeccable tone, technical mastery over his instrument, and a soft spoken dedication to advancing the craft of classical guitar. Although he has a wide collection of instruments, he is most known for his association with Matthias Dammann guitars and D’Addario Pro-Arte’ Nylon strings.

Biography 

When Russell was five years of age, his family moved from Glasgow to Menorca, where he became interested in the guitar, imitating the likes of Andrés Segovia and Julian Bream. Today, Russell resides in Galicia, but spends most of his time touring and playing in prestigious musical festivals around the world. He is also a keen Golf enthusiast and has won amateur golf tournaments in Scotland and Spain. Russell is an avid supporter of his local football team, Celta de Vigo.

Honours And Awards 
Under the tutelage of Hector Quine at the Royal Academy of Music, Russell won the Julian Bream Guitar Prize twice. He graduated in 1974 with a scholarship from the Ralph Vaughan Williams Trust. Later, he won numerous international competitions, including the Andrés Segovia Competition, the José Ramírez Competition, and Spain's Francisco Tárrega Competition. Russell was named a Fellow of the Royal Academy of Music in London in 1997. In May 2003, he was awarded the honour of being made "adopted son" of Es Migjorn Gran, the town on Menorca where he grew up. In November 2003, he was given the Medal of Honour of the Conservatory of the Balearics. In 2005, he won a Grammy Award for best instrumental soloist in classical music for his CD Aire Latino. In May 2005, Russell received homage from the music conservatory of Vigo, culminating with the opening of the new auditorium given the name "Auditorio David Russell." David was named honorary member of “Amigos de la Guitarra” - the oldest guitar society in Spain - in 2009 and he was inducted into the Hall of Fame of the Guitar Foundation of America in 2018.

Discography

References

External links
 Official Website
 David Russell's YouTube Page
 Interview with David Russell by Bruce Duffie, June 20, 1996
 Interview with David Russell by Paul Magnussen, April 10, 2003
 Photos of Masterclass (Ligita 2005)
 Photos of Concert (Ligita 2005)
 Some photos of LP covers (Oviatt Library Digital Collections)

Scottish classical guitarists
1953 births
20th-century classical musicians
Living people
Grammy Award winners
Fellows of the Royal Academy of Music
20th-century British guitarists